The 2013 AMA Pro American Superbike Championship was the 38th running of the AMA Superbike Championship.  The championship covered 8 rounds beginning at Daytona International Speedway on March 16 and concluding at Mazda Raceway Laguna Seca on September 29.  The champion was Josh Herrin riding a Yamaha.

Calendar

  = MotoGP weekend
  = World Superbike weekend

External links
The official website of the AMA Pro Racing Championship 

AMA Superbike Championship seasons
AMA Pro American Superbike
AMA Pro American Superbike